
This is a list of notable occult writers.

A-B

C-D

E-F

G-H

I-J

K-L

M-N

O-P

R-S

T-W

Y-Z

 
Lists of writers
Religion-related lists